Rodolfo Terragno (born 16 November 1943) is an Argentine politician and lawyer, former Senator and journalist. From 2016 to 2019, he was Argentina's ambassador to UNESCO.

Life and times
Terragno was born in Buenos Aires, Argentina, in 1943 and obtained a law degree from the University of Buenos Aires in 1967, founding the law firm of Terragno & Associates. He married Sonia Pascual Sánchez, with whom he had two children. He became a prestigious journalist, appointed editor-in-chief for the newsmagazine Confirmado between 1967 and 1968, was a columnist for La Opinión newspaper, and an editor in Cuestionario magazine. Terragno became Adjunct Professor of Law at his alma mater in 1973. Intimidation by the dictatorship installed in 1976 led to his exile in Caracas, where he became editor-in-chief of El Diario de Caracas. In 1980, he was appointed researcher for the Institute of Latin American Studies in London and for the London School of Economics, posts he held until 1982. He remained in London as editor-in-chief of Letters, until 1987.

Affiliated to the centrist Radical Civic Union since 1961, he was appointed Minister of Public Works by President Raúl Alfonsín in 1987, whereby he initiated a modest program of privatizations. Terragno received the Ordre National du Mérite from French President François Mitterrand, in 1987. Elected Congressman in 1993, he campaigned against the Olivos Pact negotiated between UCR leader Raúl Alfonsín and President Carlos Menem, who sought the deal in a bid to amend the Argentine Constitution to allow himself reelection. He sought the UCR's Vice-Presidential nomination in a ticket with Federico Storani, but was defeated by Alfonsín's choice: Río Negro Province Governor Horacio Massaccesi. Loyal to the struggling UCR, he agreed to be Massaccesi's Chief of Staff-designate in March, a move that did not stave off defeat in the May 1995 elections.

Out of Congress, he sought and won election as President of the UCR, helping negotiate a successful alliance with the center-left Frepaso. The Alliance's victory in the 1997 midterm elections paved the way for their victory in 1999. Terragno resigned from Congress to accept the influential post of Chief of the Cabinet of Ministers for President Fernando de la Rúa, though fallout over a bribery scandal involving the President led to his resignation in October 2000. He was elected Senator for Buenos Aires in 2001 and served until 2007, by which time he sat on a splinter UCR ticket. Terragno began efforts to join Vice President Julio Cobos (a popular UCR figure distanced from the President, Cristina Kirchner) in an alliance with ARI leader Elisa Carrió in January 2009, though no agreement was reached.

Selected publications

La Simulación (2005)
El Peronismo de los '70 (2005)
Falklands/Malvinas (2002)
Maitland & San Martín (1998)
Bases para un Modelo de Crecimiento, Empleo y Bienestar (1996)
El Nuevo Modelo (1994)
Proyecto 95 (1993)
La Argentina del Siglo 21 (1985)
The Challenge of Real Development (1987). 
Muerte y Resurrección de los Políticos (1981) 
Memorias del Presente (1984) 
Contratapas (1976) 
Los 400 Días de Perón (1974) 
Los Dueños del Poder (1972)

References

External links
 Official website
 Biography at the National Senate

1943 births
Living people
Politicians from Buenos Aires
Argentine people of Italian descent
Chiefs of Cabinet of Ministers of Argentina
Members of the Argentine Chamber of Deputies elected in Buenos Aires
Members of the Argentine Senate for Buenos Aires
Permanent Delegates of Argentina to UNESCO
20th-century Argentine lawyers
Argentine journalists
Male journalists
Radical Civic Union politicians
University of Buenos Aires alumni
Academic staff of the University of Buenos Aires
Fellows of the American Academy of Arts and Sciences